Luka Pavićević (born 17 June 1968) is a Montenegrin professional basketball coach and former player. Most recently, he served as the head coach for Alvark Tokyo of the Japanese B.League.

A point guard, Pavićević played basketball between 1982 and 2003. During his playing days, he played for Budućnost, Cibona, Jugoplastika / Pop 84, Proleter Zrenjanin, Crvena zvezda, FMP Železnik, Beobanka, Soproni Ászok, Espoon Honka, Anwil Włocławek, Rabotnički, and Besançon. He retired as a player with Crvena zvezda in 2003. In three seasons with Jugoplastika, he won three European Champions Cup championships (1988–89, 1989–90, 1990–91), three Yugoslav League titles (1988–89, 1989–90, 1990–91), and three Yugoslav Cup tournaments.

Early life
Born in Titograd to the construction engineer father Božidar who had a stint as director of the Republički zavod za urbanizam i projektovanje (RZUP) state-owned urban planning enterprise and dentist-orthodontist mother Nedeljka, young Luka grew up in the neighbourhood of Preko Morače where he attended the Maxim Gorky Elementary School.

Inspired by a documentary called Maestro about the Yugoslav basketball star player Dragan Kićanović—produced and aired on Yugoslav television as part of its 1980 Moscow Olympics coverage—Pavićević took up streetball at age 12 via joining ballers gathering daily on the concrete court in the city's Njegošev Park. Marking himself out as a quick ball handler capable of competing against significantly older individuals, the teenager caught the eye of KK Budućnost's head coach Čedomir Đurašković who invited the youngster to join the club.

Club career

KK Budućnost
Joining Budućnost in 1982, young Pavićević was immediately attached by coach Đurašković to the full squad. The fourteen-year-old point guard thus became the youngest ever player to appear in a Yugoslav top-tier league game, thus surpassing KK Šibenka 15-year-old shooting guard Dražen Petrović's late 1979 record.

Coaching career
After retirement in 2003, Pavićević joined OKK Beograd as their new head coach. Afterwards, he coached Atlas Belgrade, Hemofarm, Panionios, Alba Berlin and Chorale Roanne. In November 2015, Budućnost hired Pavićević as their new head coach. In March 2016, he parted ways with Budućnost.

In June 2017, Pavićević was named as the head coach of Alvark Tokyo of the Japanese B.League. He won two Japanese B.League titles (2017–18 and 2018–19) and FIBA Asia Champions Cup title in 2019. In June 2022, he parted ways with Alvark Tokyo.

National team coaching career
Pavićević was the head coach for the Serbia and Montenegro under-20 team at the 2004 FIBA Europe Championship in the Czech Republic and at the 2005 FIBA Europe Championship in Russia. His team won a bronze medal in 2005.

In August 2011, Pavićević was the head coach for the Serbia University team that won a gold medal at the Summer Universiade in Shenzhen, China.

In December 2011, the Basketball Federation of Montenegro named Pavićević the new head coach of the Montenegro national team. On 22 September 2014, he parted ways with the Basketball Federation of Montenegro as the Montenegrin team coach.

In April 2015, the Islamic Republic of Iran Basketball Federation named Pavićević the new head coach of the Iran national team. He parted ways with them later that year.

In November 2016, Pavićević was named as part of the technical committee of the Japan Basketball Association, and was named interim head coach within the month following the end of the tenure of previous head coach Kenji Hasegawa. He left head coach position in 2017.

Career achievements and awards
As player:
European Champions Cup (Euroleague) champion: 3 (with Jugoplastika: 1988–89, 1989–90, 1990–91)
Finnish League champion: 1 (with Espoon Honka: 2000–01)
Yugoslav League champion: 3 (with Jugoplastika: 1988–89, 1989–90, 1990–91)
Yugoslav Cup winner: 4 (with Cibona: 1988, with Jugoplastika: 1990, 1991, with FMP Železnik: 1997)
Finnish Cup winner: 1 (with Espoon Honka: 2001)

As head coach:
 Japanese League champion: 2 (with Alvark Tokyo: 2017–18, 2018–19)
 FIBA Asia Champions Cup champion: 1 (with Alvark Tokyo: 2019)
 German League champion: 1 (with Alba Berlin: 2007–08)
 German Cup winner: 1 (with Alba Berlin: 2009)
 Montenegrin Cup winner: 1 (with Budućnost: 2016)

Head coaching record

|- 
|- style="background:#FDE910;"
| style="text-align:left;"|Alvark Tokyo
| style="text-align:left;"|2017–18
| 60||44||16|||| style="text-align:center;"|2nd in Eastern|||5||5||0||
| style="text-align:center;"|Champions
|-
|- style="background:#FDE910;"
| style="text-align:left;"|Alvark Tokyo
| style="text-align:left;"|2018–19
| 60||44||16|||| style="text-align:center;"|3rd in Eastern|||6||5||1||
| style="text-align:center;"|Champions
|-
| style="text-align:left;"|Alvark Tokyo
| style="text-align:left;"|2019–20
| 41||32||9|||| style="text-align:center;"|1st in Eastern|||-||-||-||
| style="text-align:center;"|-
|-

See also 
 List of European basketball players in the United States

References

External links 
 Eurobasket 2013 profile

Living people
1968 births
ABA League players
Alba Berlin basketball coaches
Alvark Tokyo coaches
Besançon BCD players
Espoon Honka players
Montenegrin expatriate basketball people in Japan
Ironi Nahariya players
Japan national basketball team coaches
KK Beobanka players
KK Beopetrol/Atlas Beograd coaches
KK Budućnost coaches
KK Budućnost players
KK Cibona players
KK Crvena zvezda players
KK FMP (1991–2011) players
KK Hemofarm coaches
KK Proleter Zrenjanin players
KK Rabotnički players
KK Split players
KK Włocławek players
Montenegrin basketball coaches
Montenegrin men's basketball players
Montenegrin expatriate basketball people in Germany
Montenegrin expatriate basketball people in Serbia
Montenegrin expatriate basketball people in the United States
OKK Beograd coaches
Panionios B.C. coaches
BKK Radnički players
Soproni KC players
Sportspeople from Podgorica
Utah Utes men's basketball players
Yugoslav basketball coaches
Yugoslav men's basketball players
Yugoslav expatriate basketball people in Japan
Point guards